The XIII SS Army Corps was formed in August 1944 at Breslau. It was moved to France and the Western Front. By the end of April 1945, some units of the corps operated in Czechoslovakia where they encountered the US 97th Infantry Division. Others fought north of the Danube River near Regen.

Commanders
SS-Gruppenführer Hermann Priess
SS-Gruppenführer Max Simon

Order of battle
  17th SS Panzergrenadier Division Götz von Berlichingen
  38th SS Grenadier Division Nibelungen
 113th SS Corps Intelligence Battalion 
 113th SS Corps Artillery Battalion
 113th SS Kraftfahr Company
 113th SS Military Police Troop
 SS Kampfgruppe Trümmler

References

Waffen-SS corps
Military units and formations established in 1944
Military units and formations disestablished in 1945